The Egyptian literary magazine al-Fajr (Arabic: الفجر; DMG: al-Faǧr; English: The Dawn) was published weekly in Cairo between 8 January 1925 and 31 January 1927. Ahmed Khairi Sa'id was editor-in-chief.

A group of young writers of the al-Madrasa al-Haditha ("Modernist School"), including Mahmoud Taymour (1894 -1973), Mahmoud Tahir Laasheen (1894-1954), Yahya Haqqi (1905-1993) and Husayn Fawzy (1900-1988), are considered to be the founders of the magazine. Some of them increased their popularity inside and outside of Egypt by publishing their works in al-Fajr.

Generally, the declared aim of the journal was reaching the renaissance of the Egyptian literary scene and in particular "intellectual independence".

References

Further reading

1925 establishments in Egypt
1927 disestablishments in Africa
Arabic-language magazines
Defunct literary magazines published in Egypt
Magazines established in 1925
Magazines established in 1927
Magazines published in Cairo